Christopher Braide is an English songwriter, record producer and singer, formerly based in Malibu, Los Angeles, California, United States. Braide is known for being a pianist.

First signed as a solo artist by David A. Stewart in the UK and Craig Kallman at Atlantic Records in the US, Braide relocated to Los Angeles to produce and write for artists including Sia, Lana Del Rey, Britney Spears, Nicki Minaj, Christina Aguilera, Selena Gomez, David Guetta, Halsey, Wrabel, Marc Almond, Beth Ditto, Yuna and Beyoncé.

Braide is a frequent collaborator of Sia; together they have written for her own projects, movie soundtracks and for several other artists. Notable songs they have written over the years include "Kill and Run" for The Great Gatsby film and soundtrack, "Helium" for the 2017 Fifty Shades Darker film and soundtrack, "Pretty Isn't Perfect" and "Unstoppable" for the Rio 2016 Olympic Games, "God Made You Beautiful" for the Beyoncé film Life Is But a Dream, "Perfume" for Britney Spears, "Blank Page" for Christina Aguilera, and "She Wolf (Falling to Pieces)" for David Guetta featuring Sia. Most recently, their song "Helium" was remixed for MAC cosmetics a collaboration for the cosmetic company's AIDS Fund by David Guetta and Afrojack, and a new single, "Flames", was released by David Guetta.

He has a duo group with Geoff Downes (Yes, Buggles, Asia and others), called Downes Braide Association (DBA), since 2012.

Braide has won an Ivor Novello award and been nominated for a Grammy. He is published by BMG Rights Management worldwide and Magical Thinking BMI.

Select songwriting and production discography

Recording artist
In 1993, Braide recorded his first solo album Chapter One - Chris Braide for Polydor Records. The album was produced by Thomas Dolby and Simply Red's Mick Hucknall. In 2014, the album was remastered and released in the UK on Plane Groovy Records

In 1996, Dave Stewart signed Braide to his Warner Bros.-backed label Anxious Records, who released a single co-written with Chris Difford, "If I Hadn't Got You", and second single "Heavenly Rain", followed a year later by the album, Life in a Minor Key, which was co-produced by Braide and David A. Stewart at Electric Lady Studios in New York. The record was released in the US on Atlantic Records and in 2013 a vinyl version was released on Plane Groovy Records.

In 2012, Braide teamed up with Geoff Downes under the name "DBA" ("Downes Braide Association"). The result was an album, Pictures of You, released in Summer 2012 on Plane Groovy Records. Since then, they have released three more studio recordings (Suburban Ghosts in 2015, Skyscraper Souls in 2017 and Halcyon Hymns in 2021), and a live album (Live in England in 2019).

Filmography
Braide wrote, performed or produced songs on the following film soundtracks:

 The Princess Diaries (2002)
 Without a Paddle (2004)
 St Trinian's (2007)
 The Inbetweeners Movie (2011)
 The Great Gatsby (2013)
 Youth (2015)
 Leap (2016)
 Miss Peregrine's Home for Peculiar Children (2016)
 Fifty Shades Darker (2017)
 Wonder Woman (2017)
 Gnome Alone (2017)
 Charming (2018)
 Vox Lux (2018)
 Duck Duck Goose (2018)
 Trouble (2021)

Advertising campaigns
He wrote, performed or produced songs in the following advertising campaigns:
 Bud Light – Aluminium Super Bowl – 10 ft Tall ft Wrabel (2014)
 Gillette – Unstoppable/Pretty Isn't Perfect/ Rio Olympic Games (2016)
 Pocky Sticks – Rescue – Yuna (2016)
 Estee Lauder ft Kendall Jenner and Elle King / Wild Love (2017)
 Estee Lauder  – See the world with wide-open eyes – It's You ft Magical Thinker and Wrabel (2017)
 MAC – Helium / Guetta Re-mix (2018)
 Lancome Paris/ Zendaya ft Sia "Unstoppable" (2019)
 Samsung Galaxy Sia "Unstoppable" (2022)

References

External links
Official website
Downes Braide Association (DBA)
Interview, MuuMuse 2010

1973 births
Living people
English male singer-songwriters
English record producers
Musicians from Cheshire
21st-century English singers
21st-century British male singers
The Trevor Horn Band members